Skjerstad Kraftlag was a power company that operated in the former municipality of Skjerstad, Norway with about 1,000 subscribers. It was owned by the municipality.

History
The company was established on 2 March 1947, though signings for shares had been done since 1943. When the municipality of Skjerstad was merged with Bodø on 1 January 2005 an agreement to sell the power company was made, and on 19 November 2005 the company BDF-Energi, owned by Bodø Energi (74%) and Fauske Lysverk (26%) bought the company for NOK 125 million. The purchase was strategically important to have control over a 3.3% stake in Salten Kraftsamband.

Defunct electric power companies of Norway
Companies based in Nordland
Energy companies established in 1947
Energy companies disestablished in 2005
1947 establishments in Norway
2005 disestablishments in Norway